"Losing My Life" is a song by American rock band Falling in Reverse. It was released on June 26, 2018 through Epitaph Records. The song is the continuation of the previous single "Losing My Mind". The song was re-released on April 8, 2019 as part of the Falling in Reverse EP Drugs.

Promotion and release
Following the release of the single "Losing My Mind", the band was expected to announce their upcoming fifth studio album following the release of their fourth studio album Coming Home. However after both singles were released, vocalist and bandleader Ronnie Radke announced that no albums would be released for a long time, for now they would only focus on releasing singles or EPs.

The single was announced days before it was released, the preview video showed some scenes where the music video was recorded and moat a grave that marked the year 2033. Finally the single was released and the music video on YouTube reached a million views in just one week. Vocalist Ronnie Radke spoke about the song:

Composition and lyric
"Losing My Life" is the continuation of "Losing My Mind", Ronnie Radke spoke about the lyrics of the song: "It be constant judgments from our peers, not being good enough, to not knowing who to trust, I’ve come to the realization that we are all the same at our core. Yet, ironically, we project our fears in the form of hate onto each other". Radke said: "Bouncing between dimensions, as the video portrays, there are two of me that are polar opposites of each other: one trying to prove to the world he is good enough, and the other trying to stop him from it. He ultimately kills his 'reflection' — the mirrored entity negating his progress by inter-dimensional time travel— only to find that the other version of 'him' he kills comes back to life, regenerating the feelings again. It's my analogy of the cyclical battle we all face on a day to day basis. However, this underlying message can be translated in many different ways. It's all in the eyes and ears of the beholder." Ronnie Radke's rap influences are reflected in this song. Like the previous single, this song continues the rap era in the band but this time with choruses and heavier riffs, including a bridge in the song accompanied by a breakdown that marks the return of the metalcore style and gutturals to the band.

Music video
The music video was released the same day the single was released and was directed by Ethan Lader. In the music video it can be shown that Ronnie fights with his other person which seems to be the version of Ronnie that appears in the video for "Losing My Mind", it also shows us a part where Ronnie's daughter, Willow Radke, appears, who asks him why he went to prison. In other scenes an actress appears who represents Willow but in her adult version in the year 2033 trying to revive her father.

Personnel
 Ronnie Radke – lead vocals, producer, engineer, composition
 Derek Jones – rhythm guitar, backing vocals
 Zakk Sandler – keyboards, synth, rhythm guitar, backing vocals, percussion
 Tyler Burgess – bass, backing vocals
 Max Georgiev – lead guitar, backing vocals
 Brandon "Rage" Richter – drums, percussion
 Tyler Smyth – producer
 Charles Kallaghan Massabo – engineer, co-producer, beat

References

External links
 Lyrics of this song at Genius

2018 singles
2018 songs
Falling in Reverse songs
Songs written by Ronnie Radke
Epitaph Records singles